Tramp were a British blues band, active during the late 1960s and early 1970s on an intermittent basis.  This on/off activity and the loose, transient nature of the band's line-up were reflected in the group's name.

The line-up centred on the brother-sister pairing of Dave Kelly and Jo Ann Kelly, and included various members of Fleetwood Mac, plus various session musicians.  The band released two albums; Tramp in 1969, and Put A Record On in 1974.  All members participated in many other projects before, after and even during their time with Tramp.

Members
Dave Kelly - vocals, guitar
Jo Ann Kelly - vocals
Bob Brunning - bass guitar
Mick Fleetwood - drums
Danny Kirwan - guitar
Bob Hall - piano
Dave Brooks - saxophone
Ian Morton - percussion

References

1969 establishments in the United Kingdom
1974 disestablishments in the United Kingdom
British rock music groups
British blues musical groups
Musical groups established in 1969
Musical groups disestablished in 1974